The European Trade Union Institute (ETUI)  is the independent research and training centre of the European Trade Union Confederation (ETUC). Its mission is to build bridges between the world of research and the world of labour, in order to support, strengthen and stimulate the European trade union movement.

The ETUI places its expertise – acquired in particular in the context of its links with universities and specific academic and expert networks – in the service of workers’ interests at European level and of the strengthening of the social dimension of the European Union.

In its present form, the ETUI is the result of the merger, in 2005, of the following three specialist bodies: the European Trade Union Institute (ETUI, founded in 1978), the European Trade Union College (ETUCO, founded in 1989) and the Trade Union Technical Bureau (TUTB – for occupational health and safety issues – also founded in 1989).

The Institute is currently composed of two departments:
 Research
 Education

In order to perform its mission, the ETUI employs a multinational team of some 60 staff members coming from all parts of Europe and receives financial support from the European Union.

Research 
The ETUI is recognised as a centre of excellence in several areas of research such as European industrial relations (including European Works Council, worker participation, European social dialogue, etc.) and working conditions (health and safety, exposure to dangerous substances – REACH, etc.).

The research department consists of three subject units:
 Europeanisation of industrial relations
 Economic, employment and social policies
 Working conditions, health and safety

Every year the ETUI, publishes Benchmarking Working Europe, the ETUI’s annual stock-take of macro-economic, social and bargaining conditions in Europe.

Periodicals 
 Transfer: European Review of Labour and Research is a quarterly peer-reviewed academic journal that covers the field of management studies. It is published by SAGE Publications on behalf of the European Trade Union Institute.
 SEER Journal for Labour and Social Affairs in Eastern Europe: SEER, the Journal for Labour and Social Affairs in Eastern Europe, is published for the European Trade Union Institute by Nomos, Germany.
 HesaMag: HesaMag is a bi-annual magazine all about health and safety at work, published in English and French since 2009.

Education 
Previously European Trade Union College, the Education Department of the ETUI provides training and learning activities for trade union officials and leaders, shop stewards, young officers, and unionists.

The department delivers about 100 courses a year to more than 2000 participants. Trade unionists members of the ETUC, or European Works' Councils, SE works council and special negotiation bodies (such as company level employee representatives) can participate to the training. Some of the courses lead to a qualification, in collaboration with TUC in the UK and University of Lille in France.

Governance 
The Institute is composed of a General Assembly, which meets at least once a year and it is composed of members of the ETUC. It elects the members of the Management Committee.
The Management Committee is composed of 28 members of the ETUC, elected by the General Assembly and it deals with the administration of the Institute.

The Director's Committee is composed of:
 Luca Visentini, General Secretary of the ETUC
 Per Hilmersson, Deputy General Secretary of the ETUC
 Liina Carr, Confederal Secretary in charge of the ETUI
 Philippe Pochet, General Director ETUI
 Nicola Countouris, Director of the Research Department
 Vera Dos Santos, Director of the Education Department
 Olga Barth, Administrative and Finance Manager

An Advisory Group, composed of 25 members contributes to the multi-annual strategy of the ETUI.

Networks 
 GoodCorp - the research network on Corporate Governance
 Trade Union related Research Institutes (TURI)
 SEEurope - the research network on the European Company (SE)
 The Transnational Trade Union Rights Experts Network (TTUR)
 Netlex - the ETUC network of trade union legal experts
 Network on psychosocial risks
 Eurotrainers
 European Trade Union centres and schools

Services 
 Web site Worker Participation.eu
 European Works Councils Database (EWCDB)
 EWC Training.eu
 European Company (SE) Database
 European sectoral social dialogue database
 The Documentation Centre
 RISCTOX database

References

External links 
 Official website of the European Trade Union Institute
 The Documentation Centre
 Worker Participation.eu
 European Works Councils Database (EWCDB)
 EWC Training.eu
 Trade Union related Research Institutes (TURI)

Labor relations
European Trade Union Confederation
Think tanks based in Belgium
Research institutes in Belgium